Chah Gazamani (also Romanized as Chāh Gazāmānī) is a village in Golestan Rural District, in the Central District of Sirjan County, Kerman Province, Iran. At the 2006 census, its population was 20, in 8 families.

References 

Populated places in Sirjan County